= Barabatum =

- Location within Armenia Location within Syunik Province
- Coordinates: 39°12′39″N 46°24′56″E
- Country: Armenia
- Marz (Province): Syunik
- Time zone: UTC+4 ( )
  - Summer (DST): UTC+5 ( )

Barabatum (also, Barabat’um, Barbatum, Brrat’umb, Parravat’ap’, and Prravt’umb) is a town in the Syunik Province of Armenia.
